Boxley Place is a historic home located at Louisa, Louisa County, Virginia. The original house was built in 1860, as an Italianate/Greek Revival-style dwelling.  It was enlarged and remodeled in 1918 by architect D. Wiley Anderson in the Colonial Revival-style. It is a two-story, brick dwelling with large rear and side additions.  The front facade features a two-story portico supported by Ionic order columns, with Chinese Chippendale railings. Also on the property are a contributing log house and well.

It was listed on the National Register of Historic Places in 2007.

References

Houses on the National Register of Historic Places in Virginia
Houses completed in 1918
Colonial Revival architecture in Virginia
Houses in Louisa County, Virginia
National Register of Historic Places in Louisa County, Virginia